Lucas Patricio Palacios Covarrubias (born 17 March 1974) is a Chilean politician, economist and current militant of Unión Demócrata Independiente (UDI).

On 28 October 2019, he was appointed by Sebastián Piñera as Minister of Economy, Development and Tourism amid beginnings of the 2019–20 social crisis where his predecessor Juan Andrés Fontaine gave controversial statements which immediately animated 18 October riots.

References

External links

1974 births
Living people
Chilean people
Pontifical Catholic University of Chile alumni
University of Salamanca alumni
Independent Democratic Union politicians
21st-century Chilean politicians